Henry Louis Jones (born December 29, 1967 in St. Louis, Missouri) is a former American football Safety in the National Football League. He played for the Buffalo Bills (1991–2000), the Minnesota Vikings (2001), and the Atlanta Falcons (2002).

Professional career
In just his second year in the NFL, Jones was a Pro Bowl selection as he led the league along with Minnesota's Audray McMillian with 8 interceptions.

Jones's most superb season was in 1992.  In the 10 following seasons, he recorded just 10 more total interceptions. He retired after the 2002 season with 18 career interceptions, which he returned for 455 yards and 4 touchdowns. He also recorded 5 sacks, 9 fumble recoveries, 14 fumble return yards, and 41 kickoff return yards.

References

External links
Jones at pro-football-reference.com
Jones at databasefootball.com

1967 births
Living people
Players of American football from St. Louis
American football safeties
Illinois Fighting Illini football players
Buffalo Bills players
Minnesota Vikings players
Atlanta Falcons players
American Conference Pro Bowl players
Ed Block Courage Award recipients